Xidian is a town in Ninghai County in eastern Zhejiang province, China, abutting Xiangshan Harbour to the east and about  north of the county seat. It borders Fenghua to the north, Meilin Subdistrict to the south, and Shenquan to the west. , it had one residential community (社区) and 11 villages under its administration. In January 2010, Xidian was designated a satellite town of Ningbo, rendering it some county-level economic and social administrative rights, though it is de jure a town, one level below the county.

Economy 
Xidian's industrial output primarily consists of household electronics, educational materials, automotive spare parts, and in 2001, the town was the No. 1 producer of flashlights at the township-level.

Transport 
G15 Shenyang–Haikou Expressway has an exit, also designated as the northern exit for Ninghai County, in the town. The Ningbo–Taizhou–Wenzhou Railway also passes through the vicinity.

See also 
 List of township-level divisions of Zhejiang

References 

Township-level divisions of Zhejiang